Yuri Ivanovich Kayurov (born 30 September 1927) is a Soviet and Russian stage and film actor. People's Artist of the RSFSR (1979). Winner of two USSR State Prizes (1978, 1983). One of the most famous performers of the role of Vladimir Lenin in film and on stage.

References

External links

  Yuri Kayurov on Maly Theater's site

Kayurov, Yuri
20th-century Russian male actors
21st-century Russian male actors
Living people
Kayurov, Yuri
Honored Artists of the RSFSR
Kayurov, Yuri
Kayurov, Yuri
Kayurov, Yuri
Kayurov, Yuri
Kayurov, Yuri
Kayurov, Yuri
Kayurov, Yuri
Kayurov, Yuri
Russian male film actors
Russian male stage actors
Kayurov, Yuri
Soviet male stage actors
Vladimir Lenin